{{DISPLAYTITLE:C23H26O4}}
The molecular formula C23H26O4 (molar mass: 366.45 g/mol, exact mass: 366.1831 u) may refer to:

 Estradiol furoate, an estrogen medication and estrogen ester
 PSB-SB-1202, a coumarin derivative

Molecular formulas